Felix Michael Lartey was a Ghanaian barrister who served as the Chief Justice of the Gambia from 1999 to 2001.

See also
List of judges of the Supreme Court of Ghana
Supreme Court of Ghana

References 

Chief justices of the Gambia
Living people
Year of birth missing (living people)
Justices of the Supreme Court of Ghana
20th-century Ghanaian judges